Bohdan Ihorovych Sarnavskyi (born 29 January 1995) is a Ukrainian professional footballer who plays as a goalkeeper for Kryvbas Kryvyi Rih.

Career
Sarnavskyi is product of Dynamo Kyiv and Arsenal Kyiv.

He made his debut for FC Arsenal entering as a main squad player in game against Dnipro Dnipropetrovsk on 2 March 2013 in the Ukrainian Premier League.

On 7 July 2022, he signed a full contract with Kryvbas Kryvyi Rih.

Honours
Shakhtar Donetsk
 Ukrainian Cup: 2015–16

References

External links

1995 births
Living people
Footballers from Kyiv
Ukrainian footballers
Association football goalkeepers
Ukraine under-21 international footballers
Ukraine youth international footballers
Ukrainian Premier League players
Israeli Premier League players
FC Arsenal Kyiv players
FC Shakhtar Donetsk players
FC Vorskla Poltava players
FC Ufa players
NK Veres Rivne players
FC Lviv players
SC Dnipro-1 players
Hapoel Tel Aviv F.C. players
Ukrainian expatriate footballers
Expatriate footballers in Russia
Ukrainian expatriate sportspeople in Russia
Expatriate footballers in Israel
Ukrainian expatriate sportspeople in Israel